Rougemont or de Rougemont may refer to:

Places
 Rougemont, Quebec, Canada
Rougemont Airport
Mont Rougemont, part of the Monteregian Hills
 Rougemont, Côte-d'Or, France
 Rougemont, Doubs, France
 Rougemont-le-Château, Territoire de Belfort, France
 Château de Rougemont
 Rougemont, Switzerland
 Rougemont, North Carolina, U.S.
 Rougemont Castle, in Exeter, Devon
Rougemont Gardens
 Rougemont Castle, Weeton, in North Yorkshire, England
 Rougemont – Chanteloup railway station in the Rougemont neighbourhood of Sevran, Paris, France
 Rougemont School, in Llantarnam, Wales

People
 Denis de Rougemont (1906–1985), a Swiss writer and cultural theorist 
 Louis de Rougemont (1847–1921), a Swiss explorer
 Marc de Rougemont (born 1972), a French rugby player
 Michel-Nicolas Balisson de Rougemont (1781-1840), a French writer

Other uses
 Rougemont, later Bessemer, a GWR 3031 Class locomotive

See also

Rugemont Castle, in Ridgmont, Bedfordshire, England
Mount Rouge, Graham Land, Antarctic Peninsula, Antarctica; a mountain
Mont Rouge, Pennine Alps, Switzerland; a mountain
Morne Rouge (disambiguation)
Rouge (disambiguation)